The Glen Clark ministry was the combined Cabinet (formally the Executive Council of British Columbia) that governed British Columbia from February 22, 1996 to August 25, 1999. It was led by Glen Clark, the 31st premier of British Columbia, and consisted of members of the New Democratic Party (NDP).

The Glen Clark ministry was established in the final months of the 35th Parliament of British Columbia, after Mike Harcourt stepped down as leader and Clark was elected as his successor. Following the 1996 British Columbia general election, it continued to govern through the first three years of the 36th Parliament of British Columbia, until Clark stepped down in 1999. It was succeeded by the Miller ministry.

List of ministers

Cabinet composition and shuffles

Clark's initial cabinet consisted of 15 members, down from 18 in the Harcourt ministry. Clark reduced the number of portfolios by three: the ministries of government services and housing were eliminated, and the energy, mines and petroleum portfolio was merged with employment and investment. Additionally, the ministry of skills, training and labour was split, with the responsibility for skills and labour moved under the ministry of education. Clark made only modest changes to the cabinet: of the so-called "gang of six" that, along with Clark, had shaped much of Harcourt's agenda, three kept their portfolios — Moe Sihota (environment), Elizabeth Cull (finance), Joy MacPhail (social services) — and two earned promotions: Dan Miller moved to the enlarged ministry of employment and investment and was named deputy premier, and Andrew Petter moved to health. Additionally, four other ministers held onto their portfolios: John Cashore (aboriginal affairs), David Zirnhelt (agriculture), Ujjal Dosanjh (attorney general) and Bill Barlee (small business and tourism). Five ministers were dropped, as they had decided against running for re-election: Art Charbonneau, Anne Edwards, Darlene Marzari, Jackie Pement and Harcourt himself. Three new ministers were added: Lois Boone, who had briefly served in the Harcourt ministry; Corky Evans, second-place finisher in the 1996 leadership election; and Dennis Streifel.

Following the 1996 election, Clark shuffled his cabinet. The number of ministers was reduced further, to 13, which Clark said was the smallest in "40 or 50 years". Cull and Barlee were dropped from cabinet due to losing re-election, and Clark decided to give more responsibilities to the remaining ministers rather than elevate backbenchers, believing that it would "bring some real focus to government". He admitted, however, that the ministers couldn't be expected to carry the larger workload forever, and anticipated expanding the cabinet by three or four ministers in about a year's time. With Petter taking over finance, Sihota taking both labour and education, MacPhail taking health and Miller gaining municipal affairs and housing, journalists Jeff Lee and Vaughn Palmer, both of the Vancouver Sun, noted that the "gang of five" increased their presence in the government.

On June 26, 1996, Penny Pridy took leave from cabinet in order to deal with her breast cancer treatment. Dan Miller was named acting minister of small business, tourism and culture during her recovery. She returned to cabinet in September.

On September 23, 1996, Clark announced the establishment of a new ministry of children and families, splitting off the responsibility from the ministry of human resources. Priddy was named the inaugural minister of children and families, and Dennis Steifel remained minister of the renamed ministry of human resources, now only responsible for managing income assistance. Backbencher Jan Pullinger was named to Priddy's old role as minister of small business, tourism and culture.

On December 12, 1996, Sihota stepped down from cabinet due to two separate conflict of interest investigations. MacPhail took over his portfolios in an acting capacity. On January 6, 1997, Clark made a mini-shuffle to fill the gap. Paul Ramsey and John Cashore took Sihota's roles as minister of education and minister of labour, respectively, with Cashore also keeping his role as minister of aboriginal affairs. Two new ministers joined cabinet: Cathy McGregor, who took over Ramsey's newly-vacated environment portfolio; and Mike Farnworth, who became minister of municipal affairs and housing, taking it out of Miller's jurisdiction. The shuffle drew criticism from the Mayor of Victoria, Bob Cross, as it reduced Victoria's presence in cabinet to one (Andrew Petter); by comparison, under Harcourt, the city had four ministers. Clark, however, said regional considerations were behind the appointments, as McGregor became the second member of cabinet from the Interior region.

Clark made his first major cabinet shuffle on February 18, 1998. All but four ministers — Dosanjh, Ramsey, Zirnhelt and Evans — were either moved to a new portfolio or had their existing one reconfigured. Two new ministries, advanced education and fisheries, were created. MacPhail was named the new finance minister, replacing Petter. The size of cabinet expanded to 19 with the addition of four new ministers: Jenny Kwan, Harry Lali, Dale Lovick and Ian Waddell. Lovick's appointment made him the third minister from Vancouver Island; as he represented the riding of Nanaimo and Pullinger represented Cowichan-Ladysmith, the Victoria-based paper the Times Colonist suggested that the "Vancouver Island power base moved to the mid-island". The new cabinet made two firsts in B.C. political history: Jenny Kwan became the first Chinese-Canadian cabinet minister, and Lovick and Pullinger became the first married couple to be in cabinet together.

On October 20, 1998, Sihota returned to cabinet. He was named minister responsible for the Public Service, a new role that Clark said would co-ordinate all government activities and initiatives aimed at boosting the province's economy.

On January 29, 1999, Gordon Wilson, leader of the Progressive Democratic Alliance and former leader of the Liberal Party, crossed the floor to join the NDP. He was appointed to cabinet as minister responsible for the B.C. Ferry Corporation and as minister of aboriginal affairs. Dan Miller, previously responsible for the B.C. Ferry Corp., remained deputy premier and minister of energy; Lovick, previously minister of aboriginal affairs, remained minister of labour, and additionally gained responsibility for the Insurance Corporation of British Columbia.

On July 16, 1999, finance minister Joy MacPhail resigned from cabinet, citing "personal reasons … not family reasons". Reporter Judith Lavoie suggested it "mark[ed] the first major, public crack in the solidarity of the beleaguered NDP government." Wilson was appointed finance minister to replace her. Five days later, on July 22, Clark announced a major shuffle of his cabinet. Two new ministries were created: the ministry of social development and economic security, headed by Sihota; and the ministry of community development co-operatives and volunteers, headed by Pullinger. Four new ministers — Jim Doyle, Helmut Giesbrecht, Joan Sawicki and Joan Smallwood — joined cabinet, and one, Cathy McGregor was removed. The shuffle was widely perceived as an attempt by Clark to shore up support: Judith Lavoie of the Times Colonist suggested that Clark's renewed attention on environment and poverty was an appeal to the party's left-wing base, while Michael Smythe of The Province characterized the shuffle as "silenc[ing] dissdent, reward[ing] loyalists".

Notes

References

Citations

Sources

Politics of British Columbia
Executive Council of British Columbia
1996 establishments in British Columbia
Cabinets established in 1996
1999 disestablishments in British Columbia
Cabinets disestablished in 1999